The 1996 Gerry Weber Open was a men's tennis tournament played on grass courts at the Gerry Weber Stadion in Halle, North Rhine-Westphalia in Germany and was part of the World Series of the 1996 ATP Tour. It was the fourth edition of the tournament and was held from 17 June through 23 June 1996. Unseeded Nicklas Kulti won the singles title.

Finals

Singles

 Nicklas Kulti defeated  Yevgeny Kafelnikov 6–7(5–7), 6–3, 6–4
 It was Kulti's 1st singles title of the year and the 3rd and last of his career.

Doubles

 Byron Black /  Grant Connell defeated  Yevgeny Kafelnikov /  Daniel Vacek 6–1, 7–5
 It was Black's 4th title of the year and the 15th of his career. It was Connell's 3rd title of the year and the 20th of his career.

References

External links
 Official website 
 ITF tournament edition details

 
Gerry Weber Open
Halle Open
Gerry Weber Open
Gerry Weber Open